Pork Barrel is a 1979 video game developed by George Blank and published by Ramware for the TRS-80.

Contents
Pork Barrel is a game about passing bills to win an election.

Reception
Jon Mishcon reviewed Pork Barrel in The Space Gamer No. 42. Mishcon commented that "If you can find people who'll pretend to be politicians with conscience, this game is fine. If you play to win, look elsewhere."

Reviews
Moves #56, p28

References

External links
SoftSide review

1979 video games
Government simulation video games
TRS-80 games
TRS-80-only games
Video games developed in the United States